Wuhan University School of Journalism and Communication is a school for the study of journalism and communication in Wuhan University.

Established in 1983, the school is part of the Faculty of Humanities.

Majors
The school has four concentrations: news, radio and television, advertisement, internet communication.

References

External links
School of Journalism and Communication

Wuhan University Faculty of Humanities